The N4 is a Bangladeshi national highway connecting Joydebpur near the Bangladeshi capital Dhaka and Jamalpur. It is part of AH2 and AH41 in the Asian Highway Network.

References

National Highways in Bangladesh